In mathematics, Bochner's tube theorem (named for Salomon Bochner) shows that every function holomorphic on a tube domain in  can be extended to the convex hull of this domain. 

Theorem Let  be a connected open set. Then every function  holomorphic on the tube domain  can be extended to a function holomorphic on the convex hull .

See also  for other proofs.

Generalizations 

The generalized version of this theorem was first proved by Kazlow (1979), also proved by Boivin and Dwilewicz (1998) under more less complicated hypothese.

By "Int ch(S)" we will mean the interior taken in the smallest dimensional space which contains "ch(S)".

References 

Several complex variables
Theorems in complex analysis